Wuala  was a secure online file storage, file synchronization, versioning and backup service originally developed and run by Caleido Inc. It is now part of LaCie, which is in turn owned by Seagate Technology. The service stores files in data centres that are provided by Wuala in multiple European countries (France, Germany, Switzerland). An earlier version also supported distributed storage on other users' machines, however this feature has been dropped. On 17 August 2015 Wuala announced that it was discontinuing its service and that all stored data would be deleted on 15 November 2015. Wuala recommended a rival cloud storage startup, Tresorit, as an alternative to its remaining customers.

History

Most research and development occurred at the Swiss Federal Institute of Technology (ETH) in Zürich.

14 August 2008
An "open beta"-java-applet, available from the website, could be run from a web browser.

19 September 2008
The Wuala Webstart project was registered on SourceForge.net.

26 October 2008
An Alpha release REST API, at a very early stage of development, supported HTTP GET requests for content that was either public, or shared through a keyed hyperlink.

16 December 2008
The Uniform Resource Locator changed from http://wua.la/  to http://www.wuala.com/ and files that were public, or shared through a keyed hyperlink, were made accessible through web browsers.

19 March 2009
LaCie announced a merger with Caleido AG. Wuala described the merger as being between Wuala and LaCie (not Caleido AG and LaCie).

5 January 2010
Post-merger announcement of the first joint products.

23 May 2011
All pro features - backup, sync, file versioning and time travel - are available for everyone at no cost

28 September 2011
The "trade storage" feature was discontinued.

11 June 2014
The storage plan was shifted to a paid-only service 

31 October 2014
Wuala announced that existing free-only storage would be terminated at the end of 2014 and customers wishing to save their data should migrate away or purchase a paid plan

17 August 2015
Wuala announced that it would allow no further renewals or purchase of storage. The service will transition to read-only on 30 September 2015 and all stored data will be deleted on 15 November 2015

Features
Any registered user can:
 keep files private
 share files with other registered users
 share files with unregistered users, through a keyed hyperlink
 publish files
 backup
 file synchronization
 file versioning.

Registered and unregistered users can: receive streaming media.

When a user adds a file to Wuala, or saves changes to a file that is served by Wuala, the user's local copy of file is: first encrypted, then chunked into redundant fragments using Reed-Solomon error correction codes.  The fragments are then uploaded to the data centers.

Storage
Wuala offered free accounts that had 5 GB of storage for no charge. As of 11 June 2014 they shifted to a paid-only service. As of the end of 2014 they will no longer support any form of free-only storage, shifting entirely to a payment based usage model.

Users of joint products may start with greater amounts of storage for a limited period:
with a LaCie external hard disk drive, 10 GB for one year
or with a LaCie USB flash drive, 4 GB for two years.

Additional storage may be bought. As of June 2014, the referral system was shut down due to the new paid-only policy.

For bought storage: prices range from 29 EUR/year for 20 GB to 999 EUR/year for 1 TB.
Pricing changed in June 2014: The storage plan starts with 0.99 € per month (9 € per year) for 5 GB and ends at 159.90 € per Month (1799 € per year) for 2 TB of storage.

Trading
One of the distinguishing features of Wuala, the ability to trade local disk storage space against cloud storage, is no longer available.

User interfaces

Desktop application
The user interface offers most of the features that are normally associated with a file manager. Additional features come through integration.

A registered user can install the Java-based client application (SWT-GUI):
 on any number of Linux, Mac OS X and Microsoft Windows computers
 with FUSE, MacFUSE and Dokan respectively for file system integration.

Wuala Webstart and web browsers
Through a web browser, on a computer that has Java installed:
 the user can start/trust a Java applet, which downloads and runs a class loader allowing fast start of the latest version of the Wuala application.

If the computer is without Java, or if running of the class loader is prevented:
 any folder that is public, or shared with a weblink, can be browsed.

Non-graphical interfaces
Support for the following may be limited:
 command-line interface
 daemon
 headless system

Security
According to Wuala's FAQ, the software uses AES-256 for encryption and RSA-2048 for key exchange and signatures. Keys are organized in a key management scheme called Cryptree.

According to the FAQ, Wuala employs full client-side encryption. All files and their metadata – most OS X metadata is not supported – get encrypted before they are uploaded. The encryption key is stored such that no one, not even LaCie that operates the service, can decrypt the stored files. The disadvantage of this is that Wuala has no password recovery and all data processing needs to be done in the client (for example creating a search index). The advantage is significantly improved privacy.

Since the source code to Wuala has not been released, it is difficult to ensure that the software does what it states it does (including proper client-side encryption).  Also, updates are pushed automatically to the client machine. These facts mean that users of Wuala are not safe from possible backdoors in code.

Reviews
 2007-10-18: Unlimited online storage for free, almost: Wuala | Webware - CNET 
 2008-05-22: Online Storage with Wuala | Linux Journal
 2008-08-14: Wuala Makes Online Storage Social | News & Opinion  | PCMag.com
 2008-08-14: Wuala P2P online storage service goes live  (Download Squad)
 2008-07-18: You Have Three Days To Check Out Wuala's 'Social Grid' Storage (TechCrunch)

See also
 Comparison of file synchronization software
 List of online backup services
 Comparison of online backup services

Notes and references

External links
 

2008 software
Distributed data storage systems
Distributed file systems
File hosting
File sharing services